Yorktown Heights is a census-designated place (CDP) in the town of Yorktown in Westchester County, New York, United States. The population was 1,781 at the 2010 census.

History
Yorktown Heights is in the town of Yorktown, New York, in northern Westchester County, 45 miles from New York City, with forty square miles of rolling hills, farmland, residential areas and light industry including the IBM Thomas J. Watson Research Center. First settled in 1683, Yorktown was of strategic importance during the American Revolution, with the Pines Bridge crossing of the Croton River guarded by the 1st Rhode Island Regiment, an integrated unit which included African Americans and Native Americans. Yorktown was incorporated in 1788 and named in commemoration of the Franco-American decisive victory at Yorktown, Virginia. The Yorktown Heights Railroad Station, which last had passenger service on the New York Central Railroad's Putnam Division in 1958, was added to the National Register of Historic Places in 1981.

Geography
Yorktown Heights is at  (41.277347, −73.781290).

Like much of northern Westchester County, Yorktown is largely hilly and wooded.

Climate

Demographics

As of the census of 2000, there were 7,972 people, 2,629 households, and 2,163 families residing in the CDP. The population density was 1,399.3/mi2 (540.0/km2). There were 2,661 housing units at an average density of 467.1/mi2 (180.2/km2). The racial makeup of the CDP was 90.49% White, 2.41% African American, 0.06% Native American, 4.69% Asian, 0.01% Pacific Islander, 0.85% from other races, and 1.48% from two or more races. Hispanic or Latino of any race were 5.59% of the population.

There were 2,629 households, out of which 44.6% had children under the age of 18 living with them, 73.0% were married couples living together, 7.2% had a female householder with no husband present, and 17.7% were non-families. 15.3% of all households were made up of individuals, and 9.0% had someone living alone who was 65 years of age or older. The average household size was 3.02 and the average family size was 3.37.

In the CDP, the population was spread out, with 28.4% under the age of 18, 5.8% from 18 to 24, 27.1% from 25 to 44, 27.4% from 45 to 64, and 11.3% who were 65 years of age or older. The median age was 39 years. For every 100 females, there were 95.9 males. For every 100 females age 18 and over, there were 90.6 males.

The median income for a household in the CDP was $108,648, and the median income for a family was $137,580. Males had a median income of $91,365 versus $80,261 for females. The per capita income for the CDP was $41,349.

Landmarks
Yorktown Heights possesses many historical landmarks, specifically related to Colonial times and the Revolutionary War. They include the Hyatt House, Lanes Tavern, and one of the first Presbyterian churches in the region. Another landmark famous to the town is the former railroad station, which was built in 1905, and had been a stop on the New York and Putnam Railroad Line (also called the "Old Put"). A popular hiking destination is Turkey Mountain, maintained by the Yorktown Land Trust. The North County Trailway is a popular running and bike path that can be accessed from Yorktown Heights.

Transportation
U.S. Route 202 passes through Yorktown Heights. The Taconic State Parkway is nearby, to the west.

Yorktown Heights Railroad Station was closed in 1958, a year before passenger service was abandoned along the New York Central's Putnam Division.

Notable people
George Cehanovsky, baritone
Steve Cohen, magician
Roy Colsey, professional lacrosse player (Philadelphia Barrage)
Jonathan de Marte, Israeli-American baseball player
Susan Faludi, journalist and writer
Robert Hanssen, Russian Spies residency while in NY who was later arrested in 2001
Paul W. Jones, U.S. diplomat, Ambassador to Poland (since 2015), Ambassador to Malaysia (2010–2013)
Andrew Kavovit, actor
Biff Liff, Broadway theater producer
Dave Matthews, singer and musician (Dave Matthews Band)
Alexandria Ocasio-Cortez, U.S. Representative
Buster Olney, sportswriter 
Karen Olsen Beck, Costa Rican diplomat and politician, First Lady of Costa Rica (1954–1958, 1970–1974)
RoseMarie Panio, politician
Elisabeth Rethberg, soprano
Alex Robinson, comic book writer and artist
Mandy Rose, WWE wrestler
Dave Ross, radio talk show host
Rich Silverstein, advertising executive and creative director (Goodby, Silverstein & Partners)
George Yancopoulos, biomedical scientist
Rebekah Mercer, director of the Mercer Family Foundation

References

External links
 Yorktown Landmarks

Yorktown, New York
Census-designated places in New York (state)